So Sweet... So Perverse is a giallo film directed by Umberto Lenzi and written by Ernesto Gastaldi, starring Carroll Baker and Jean-Louis Trintignant. Set in Paris, it tells the story of a wife who plots to get rid of a rich and errant husband but is herself the victim of her accomplices.

Plot
Jean, a wealthy industrialist in Paris, has married Danielle, but she now refuses him. In revenge, he lets himself be seduced by the host's wife at a party. Closer to home, an attractive woman moves into the flat above them, and they sometimes hear an abusive lover rebuke and beat her. Jean combines chivalry and desire by offering to protect her, and soon they are lovers. She is Nicole, and her violent ex is Klaus. She warns him that Klaus will seek to kill him, which happens during a fight. His charred body shows up in a burnt-out car. 

Nicole, who in fact is Danielle's lover and accomplice, announces that Jean had given her his share in his company. Danielle begins to be haunted by guilt and, while she is on the phone with Nicole, Klaus creeps in and shoots her dead. In the absence of any better explanation, the police inspector reluctantly accepts suicide. Now rich and no longer at risk of exposure by Danielle, who had hired them, Nicole and Klaus get on a plane for Brazil. Two seats behind them is the police inspector.

Cast 
 Carroll Baker as Nicole Perrier
 Jean-Louis Trintignant as Jean Reynaud
 Erika Blanc as Danielle Reynaud
 Horst Frank as Klaus
 Helga Liné as Hélène Valmont
 Beryl Cunningham as a stripper

Production
Following the release of Orgasmo, director Umberto Lenzi and actress Carroll Baker worked again on another giallo film. The script by Ernesto Gastaldi borrows plot elements from Henri-Georges Clouzot's film Les Diaboliques (1955) and like many gialli of the era, revels in its portrayal of badly-behaved, wealthy protagonists.

Riz Ortolani provided the music score, which includes a ballad called Why? sung by J. Vincent Edward. It would be later re-used in Lenzi's film Seven Bloodstained Orchids.

Release
So Sweet...So Perverse was released in Italy on October 31, 1969 and in France on February 26, 1971.

References

Sources

External links
 
 So Sweet... So Perverse at Variety Distribution

1969 films
1960s crime thriller films
Giallo films
1960s Italian-language films
Films directed by Umberto Lenzi
Films scored by Riz Ortolani
Films with screenplays by Ernesto Gastaldi
1960s Italian films